Independent is the third studio album by American thrash metal band Sacred Reich, released in 1993 via Metal Blade and Hollywood Records. The album is considered to be a slight departure from the band's early thrash metal style heard on their previous releases, with the album featuring a groove metal sound. Independent was Sacred Reich's first full-length album with Dave McClain on drums.

The title track can be heard in the 1993 college football film The Program.

Track listing

Personnel
 Phil Rind – bass, vocals
 Wiley Arnett – lead guitar
 Jason Rainey – rhythm guitar
 Dave McClain – drums

Additional credits 
 Recorded and mixed at Eldorado Studios, North Hollywood, California, US
 Produced by Dave Jerden and Sacred Reich
 Engineered by Bryan Carlstrom
 Assistant engineered by Annette Cisneros
 Mixed by Dave Jerden
 Mastered by Eddy Schreyer at Future Disc Systems
 Cover illustration by Paul Stottler
 Portrait illustration (inlay) by John Dawson

References

External links
Sacred Reich official website
BNR Metal Sacred Reich discography page

1993 albums
Sacred Reich albums
Hollywood Records albums
Metal Blade Records albums
Albums produced by Dave Jerden